Islwyn Jones (born 8 April 1935) is a Welsh former professional footballer. He made 26 appearances in the Football League for Cardiff City.

Career

Born in Merthyr Tydfil, Jones worked in Merthyr Vale Colliery as a teenager while playing football for Troedyrhiw Boy's Club. He began his career with Cardiff City in 1952. He spent two years in the club's reserve side before making his professional debut on 13 September 1954 in a 3–1 victory over Sheffield United in place of the injured Billy Baker. He made 23 appearances in all competitions during his first season but fell out of favour the following year, losing his place to Colin Baker. He left the club at the end of the season, moving into non-league football before retiring due to a knee injury. He later worked in a Hoover factory in Pentrebach for over 30 years.

Career statistics

References

1935 births
Welsh footballers
Footballers from Merthyr Tydfil
Cardiff City F.C. players
English Football League players
Living people
Association football wing halves